Rim-Sîn II ruled the ancient Near East city-state
of Larsa from 1678 BC to 1674 BC (short chronology). Rim-Sin II was a contemporary of Samsu-iluna of Babylon.

See also

Chronology of the ancient Near East

Notes

Further reading

External links
Rim-Sin II Year Names at CDLI

Sumerian kings
Amorite kings
17th-century BC monarchs
Kings of Larsa
17th-century BC people